A Bakewell tart is an English confection consisting of a shortcrust pastry shell beneath layers of jam, frangipane, and a topping of flaked almonds. It is a variant of the Bakewell pudding, closely associated with the town of Bakewell in Derbyshire.

History
The Bakewell tart developed as a variant of the Bakewell pudding in the 20th century. Although the terms Bakewell tart and Bakewell pudding have been used interchangeably, each name refers to a specific dessert recipe. The tart is closely associated with the town of Bakewell in Derbyshire.

Variants

Cherry Bakewell
A Cherry Bakewell, also known as a Bakewell cake, is a version of the tart where the frangipane is covered with a top layer of almond-flavoured fondant and a single half glacé cherry.

Gloucester tart
In Gloucester, a similar tart was made using ground rice, raspberry jam and almond essence. In May 2013, council leader Paul James discovered a recipe for "Gloucester tart" in a Gloucester history book. Subsequently, Gloucester museums revived the recipe, serving complimentary Gloucester tarts to museum patrons.

See also
 List of almond dishes
 List of pastries
 List of pies, tarts and flans

References

External links
Bakewell Pudding or Bakewell Tart? - Bakewell.co.uk

British desserts
Culture in Derbyshire
English cuisine
Sweet pies
Tarts
Almond desserts
Foods with jam